Rolf Craft (November 1, 1937 – January 9, 2009) was an American politician who served in the Iowa Senate from the 8th district from 1977 to 1983.

He died of melanoma on January 9, 2009, in Rochester, Minnesota at age 71.

References

1937 births
2009 deaths
Republican Party Iowa state senators
Deaths from cancer in Minnesota
Deaths from melanoma
People from Waterloo, Iowa